Deh-e Ziarat (also Romanized as Deh-e Zīārat, Deh-e Zeyārt, and Deh Zīārat) is a village in Tujerdi Rural District, Sarchehan District, Bavanat County, Fars Province, Iran. At the 2006 census, its population was 594, in 125 families.

References 

Populated places in Sarchehan County